The US state of Illinois is a Democratic stronghold and one of the "big three" Democratic states alongside California and New York. It is considered one of the most Democratic states in the nation and following the 2018 elections, all six statewide elected offices are held by a Democrat. However, there is a sharp division between Democratic cities, college towns, and population centers, and highly conservative rural regions, which continue to be dominated by Republicans, but are drowned out due to their relatively low population.

Historically, Illinois was a critical swing state leaning marginally towards the Republican Party. Between its admission into the Union and 1996, it voted for the lost candidate six just times- in 1824, 1840, 1848, 1884, 1916, and 1976. However, following Bill Clinton's election in 1992, and his victory in Illinois, the state has been realigned in favor of Democratic candidates for president, with eight consecutive wins by that party, regardless of the national outcome. In 2000, George W. Bush became the first Republican to win the presidency without the state.  

Traditionally, Chicago, East Saint Louis, and the Quad Cities region have tended to vote heavily Democratic, along with the Central Illinois population centers of Peoria, Champaign-Urbana and Decatur. In recent years, Chicago's suburban collar counties continue to trend Democratic as well, contributing to the end of its swing state status.

Rod Blagojevich, a Democrat, was elected as Illinois' Governor in 2002, the first Democrat elected since 1972. Blagojevich was re-elected in 2006, defeating Republican State Treasurer Judy Baar Topinka. However, in 2009, Blagojevich was impeached and removed from office due to charges that he abused his power while in office. Lieutenant Governor Pat Quinn succeeded him. Following Quinn's election to a full term outright in 2010, the state elected in 2014 Bruce Rauner, the first Republican chief executive in twelve years. Following the 2018 elections, J.B. Pritzker became the state's current Democratic governor.

Statewide elected officials

Presidential elections

2020

The 2020 presidential election pitted former Vice President Joe Biden against the incumbent President Donald Trump. In a very high turnout election, Illinois's twenty electoral votes easily went for Joe Biden, as expected,  who received the most raw votes ever for a presidential candidate in the history of Illinois, outpacing even his former running mate, former President Barack Obama who received 3,419,348 votes in the 2008 election. Biden received 3,471,195 votes from Illinoisans who handed the Democratic Party their eighth consecutive victory in presidential elections in the state. Illinois has not voted Republican at the presidential level since 1988 when George H. W. Bush won the state. Trump won 88 of Illinois' 102 counties—mostly rural—but decisively lost the election by more than a million votes (the second largest raw vote total blowout in Illinois history) and a 16.99% margin, just 0.08% closer than his 2016 loss in the state. Turnout for this presidential election in Illinois was estimated at 72.14%, exceeding 70% turnout for the first time since 2008, and the highest turnout rate since 1992.

Biden's win was powered by overwhelming margins in Cook County and the City of Chicago and its collar counties. Trump won nearly all of the rural counties of Illinois, solidifying the rural shift towards the Republican Party. Only two counties in the state flipped, both in Biden's direction: Kendall and McLean counties. Both had voted for Trump in 2016 by less than two percentage points, but each county shifted decisively leftwards by a net five percent.

On the other hand, the suburban shift towards the Democratic Party solidified. Very few counties in America show the trend of American suburbs towards the Democratic column better than DuPage County. For nearly a century and a half, the county was a bastion of the Republican Party and conservativism, and much of the county for decades was represented by Henry Hyde in Congress. Prior to Barack Obama's election in 2008, DuPage County had not voted for a candidate who was not from the Republican Party since at least 1860, with the lone exception of the 1912 election when former President Theodore Roosevelt was on the ballot. Even in the five major Democratic Party landslide victories in the 20th century scored by Franklin D. Roosevelt in 1932, 1936, 1940, and 1944 or Lyndon B. Johnson's 1964 landslide, DuPage County still handed the Republican candidates at least 55% of the vote.

To illustrate the decisive shift the county has seen, in the 1984 presidential election, when incumbent President Ronald Reagan won re-election, he decisively won DuPage County with over three-quarters of the total vote, receiving 227,141 votes and a 75.66% share to Dukakis' meager 23.79% and 71,430 votes. As recently as the 2012 presidential election, DuPage County was still considered a swing county, which Obama won by barely a percentage point in his re-election.  By the 2020 election, Joe Biden was able to carry DuPage County by a margin of 18.07% (one point greater than Hillary Clinton's 2016 win in the county) while garnering more than 281,000 votes, the most votes for a single presidential candidate in county history. In addition, then-incumbent president Donald Trump, in a high-turnout election, managed to garner nearly 35,000 less votes than Reagan did. Thus, in the 36 years since Reagan's landslide re-election, DuPage County has seen a net shift towards the Democratic Party by a margin of just under 70%.

2016

The 2016 presidential election featured former Secretary of State Hillary Clinton against real estate mogul Donald Trump. As expected, Clinton won Illinois handily, 56% to 39%. On a nation-wide basis, Trump won the election by virtue of an Electoral College win, while losing the national popular vote. Illinois backed the Democratic candidate for the seventh consecutive presidential election. However, Trump won 90 of Illinois' 102 counties.

Illinois' historic Chicago-downstate divide deepened even further; with Clinton winning Cook County and most of the collar counties by an even larger margin than longtime Chicago resident Barack Obama did in 2012, while Trump's share of the vote was greater than Mitt Romney's four years earlier in all but two of the downstate counties. As in much of the Midwest, Trump's strong performance downstate was largely propelled by the region's many white working-class voters. County by county, the national shift toward the Republican Party under Trump was most pronounced in the Midwest, and enabled Trump to win every Midwestern state except Illinois and Minnesota, the latter of which he lost by only 1.5%.

2012

The incumbent and Illinois resident, President Barack Obama faced Republican Governor Mitt Romney, of Massachusetts, in the general election.  Barack Obama carried Illinois with a margin of four and one quarter points less, as a share of the total, than he did in his 2008 victory. Mitt Romney carried for points more than the preceding Republican nominee, John McCain; President Obama defeated Governor Romney in the electoral college overall, winning reelection.  Obama's victory in Illinois was due to an overwhelmingly strong vote total in Cook County, which includes Illinois' largest city, Chicago. Obama won Cook County with 74%, compared to Romney who received only 24.6% of the votes in Cook County. The importance of the vote in Chicago and the rest of Cook County to Obama's victory in Illinois can be illustrated by a hypothetical scenario in which its votes are not included in the overall state total. If one were to subtract all of the votes in Cook County from Illinois' total votes cast, Romney would have actually won Illinois. The 2012 statewide victory for the Democratic candidate constitutes the sixth consecutive win by that party, regardless of national outcome.

2008

The 2008 Presidential election featured Democratic candidate, and Illinois resident, Barack Obama facing off against US Senator John McCain. Barack Obama carried Illinois by a much bigger margin than Kerry did in 2004, winning in a landslide victory with nearly 62% of the vote and a more than 25 point margin of victory. In addition to carrying major urban centers, Obama won a number of rural counties as well, a trend reflected across the country and especially the Midwest. Prior to his election to President, he represented the state in the US Senate since January 2005.

2004

Democratic Presidential candidate John Kerry carried Illinois with 54% of the vote. His victory in Illinois was largely determined by a wide margin of votes cast in Cook County, with many counties outside of the Chicago metropolitan area voting for President Bush. Illinois politics are largely regionally divided, with Chicago and a few downstate microurban communities supporting Democratic candidates, the Chicago suburban counties being primarily "swing" or "purple" areas, and much of the rural portion of the state being conservative. Several of the notable "downstate" blue spots that contributed to Kerry's win include East Saint Louis, the Quad City region, Peoria, and Champaign and Jackson counties, which have a large college-bound population.

Voter registration
As of October 2016, Illinois had nearly 8 million active, registered voters.

Illinois's Federal Representation
Illinois currently has 17 House districts In the 118th Congress, 14 of Illinois's seats are held by Democrats and 3 are held by Republicans. There are as follows:

Illinois's 1st congressional district represented by Jonathan Jackson (D)
Illinois's 2nd congressional district represented by Robin Kelly (D)
Illinois's 3rd congressional district represented by Delia Ramirez (D)
Illinois's 4th congressional district represented by Chuy García (D)
Illinois's 5th congressional district represented by Mike Quigley (D)
Illinois's 6th congressional district represented by Sean Casten (D)
Illinois's 7th congressional district represented by Danny K. Davis (D)
Illinois's 8th congressional district represented by Raja Krishnamoorthi (D)
Illinois's 9th congressional district represented by Jan Schakowsky (D)
Illinois's 10th congressional district represented by Brad Schneider (D)
Illinois's 11th congressional district represented by Bill Foster (D)
Illinois's 12th congressional district represented by Mike Bost (R)
Illinois's 3rd congressional district represented by Nikki Budzinski (D)
Illinois's 4th congressional district represented by Lauren Underwood (D)
Illinois's 5th congressional district represented by Mary Miller (R)
Illinois's 6th congressional district represented by Darin LaHood (R)
Illinois's 7th congressional district represented by Eric Sorensen (D)

Illinois's two United States Senators are Democrats Dick Durbin and Tammy Duckworth, serving since 1997 and 2017, respectively. 

Illinois is part of the United States District Court for the Northern District of Illinois, the United States District Court for the Central District of Illinois, and the United States District Court for the Southern District of Illinois in the federal judiciary. The district's cases are appealed to the Chicago-based United States Court of Appeals for the Seventh Circuit.

See also
Elections in Illinois
Government of Illinois
Political party strength in Illinois

References

External links